Willem Johan van der Oord (27 September 1919 – 5 September 1985) was a Dutch hydraulic engineer. He was involved in setting up the Mekong Committee and served as its Executive agent from December 1969 until June 1980. He also worked for the United Nations Economic and Social Commission for Asia and the Pacific.

Van der Oord was born in Haarlemmermeer in September 1919. He was elected a correspondent of the Royal Netherlands Academy of Arts and Sciences in 1969. He died in September 1985 at the age of 65.

References

1919 births
1985 deaths
20th-century Dutch engineers
Hydraulic engineers
Members of the Royal Netherlands Academy of Arts and Sciences
People from Haarlemmermeer